Scythropiodes is a genus of moth in the family Lecithoceridae.

Species
 Scythropiodes barbellatus Park & Wu, 1997
 Scythropiodes elasmatus Park & Wu, 1997
 Scythropiodes gnophus Park & Wu, 1997
 Scythropiodes hamatellus Park & Wu, 1997
 Scythropiodes jiulianae Park & Wu, 1997
 Scythropiodes leucostola (Meyrick, 1921)
 Scythropiodes malivora (Meyrick, 1930)
 Scythropiodes oncinius Park & Wu, 1997
 Scythropiodes triangulus Park & Wu, 1997
 Scythropiodes tribula (Wu, 1997)
 Scythropiodes ussuriella Lvovsky, 1996

Former species
 Scythropiodes seriatopunctata Matsumura, 1931
 Scythropiodes unimaculata Matsumura, 1931

References

Natural History Museum Lepidoptera genus database

 
Lecithocerinae
Moth genera